Johanne Whiley-Morton (born 4 July 1965), better known by her professional name Jo Whiley, is an English radio DJ and television presenter. She was the host of the long-running weekday later weekend Jo Whiley Show on BBC Radio 1. She currently presents her weekday evening Radio 2 show.

Early life and education
Whiley was born in Northampton to Martin, an electrician, and Christine, a postmistress. She attended Campion School<ref name="NC&E">Northampton Chronicle & Echo 4 November 2011, p. 13, "Sweet toothed Jo's Children in Need 'land of cake believe' stunt"</ref> at Bugbrooke, near Northampton and then studied applied languages at Brighton Polytechnic. She swam competitively for Northamptonshire.

Career

Early career
In Whiley's final year of her degree, still unsure of what she wanted to do, a conversation with a lecturer led to a job with BBC Radio Sussex on a show called Turn It Up. It allowed anyone to get on the radio and required Whiley to attend shows and interview the musicians.

After a year, Whiley left for City University London for a one-year course on radio journalism. After writing many letters, she got a job as a researcher on WPFM, a BBC Radio 4 youth culture and music show. When the presenters Terry Christian and Gary Crowley left, she took over, gaining her first presenting role. She then moved into television, firstly at British Satellite Broadcasting where she produced and presented the indie show, and then at Channel 4 where she worked as a researcher on The Word, with her friend Zoe Ball. Whiley moved on to BBC Radio 1 from September 1993 until March 2011, during the heyday of Britpop with bands such as Blur and Oasis. She hosted a weekday evening show called The Evening Session with Steve Lamacq, which was oriented towards less-mainstream, non-dance music. Whiley presented her own show on Saturday afternoon in late 1995.

From 1995 to 1998, Whiley was a regular guest presenter on Top of the Pops, initially co-presenting with fellow DJ Steve Lamacq before flying solo and alternating with Zoe Ball and Jayne Middlemiss. The three women  are referred to by the Top of the Pops website as the '90s girls', as between them they presented nearly every show of 1997. However, the only occasion when all three presented together was on Christmas Day 1997. Whiley returned to the show twice between 2005 and 2006 to co-present with lead presenter Fearne Cotton.

In July 2009, Whiley published her autobiography, My World in Motion, on CD through Random House Audiobooks.

The Jo Whiley Show on BBC Radio 1

From February 1997, Whiley had a weekday lunchtime show, called The Jo Whiley Show and later The Lunchtime Social. This included elements of the evening show, such as tour dates and occasional live 'sessions' at Maida Vale Studios while working within the restrictions of Radio 1's daytime schedule. When Simon Mayo left BBC Radio 1 for BBC Radio 5 Live and BBC Radio 2 in February 2001, Whiley's show was moved to a mid-morning slot.

In July 2008, The Jo Whiley Show was fined £75,000 for misleading listeners for an incident involving  a member of BBC staff posing as a member of the public taking part in a competition. The BBC claim Whiley herself was unaware of the deception at the time of its broadcast.

Jo Whiley's weekday show ended broadcasting  in September 2009 as part of a major shake-up of Radio 1's weekday schedule. The shake-up saw Greg James move to the afternoon slot (was occupied by Edith Bowman) and Fearne Cotton move to Whiley's slot. Her final weekday programme took place on 18 September 2009.

Following weekdays, the Jo Whiley Show was moved to weekends between 1pm to 4pm. As with her former weekday show, it still featured Live Lounge performances from visiting artists, as well as three new features: Jo's Road Trip, Top of the Shops, and SpellStar. Her last show on BBC Radio 1 was on 27 March 2011.

BBC Radio 2

Since August 2009, Whiley has been an occasional stand in presenter for Claudia Winkleman on BBC Radio 2. She was first heard on the network on Friday 21 August and made subsequent appearances on 2 October, 6 November, 27 November and 18 December 2009.

In March 2010, it was announced that Whiley and former BBC Radio 1 presenter Steve Lamacq would present a one-off Evening Session (the first in 13 years) on Good Friday (2 April) for BBC Radio 6 Music. Presented another Evening Session on 28 January 2011. After being an occasional stand-in presenter on BBC Radio 2, Whiley began presenting In Concert on Thursday evenings in April 2010.

On 1 February 2011, it was announced that Whiley would be leaving BBC Radio 1 after 17 years of broadcasting to join BBC Radio 2, where she would present an evening show from Mondays to Thursdays starting on 4 April 2011, replacing The Radcliffe and Maconie Show. Radcliffe and Maconie would, in turn, move to BBC Radio 6 Music while Whiley's Radio 1 show would be taken over by Huw Stephens. Since 2011, she has co-hosted Radio 2 Live in Hyde Park.

In March 2012, the BBC announced that as part of the broadcaster's celebration of the 20th anniversary of Britpop, Whiley and Lamacq would present a week of Evening Sessions on Radio 2 from 7 April.

In January 2018 it was announced that Whiley would join daytime on a drivetime show with Simon Mayo. This is the first time a woman had co-presented a Radio 2 daytime show in 20 years. On 22 October that year, the station announced that Mayo would be leaving Radio 2 after a backlash against the change, with Whiley moving back to an evening slot.

Television career

Whiley presents televised coverage of major music festivals, such as the Glastonbury Festival. She also narrated the BBC Three series, Little Angels. In October 2007 she became a judge on the T4 (Channel 4) show Orange unsignedAct which searches for a band trying to get a record deal. Whiley also hosted a music TV show on music channel TMF. From late 1998, Whiley hosted her own music discussion show on Channel 4, called The Jo Whiley Show, which ran for four series until late 2001.

On 15 March 2010, Whiley presented an edition of the Panorama documentary strand titled Are the Net Police Coming for You? in which she looked at the Digital Economy Bill, a proposed new law targeting people who download music illegally from the Internet.

In 2014, Whiley was a contestant on the Children in Need special of Swashbuckle with her daughter Coco.

In July 2021 Whiley was a co-presenter for the BBC's coverage of the Hampton Court Garden Festival.

Personal life
Whiley married music executive Steve Morton in July 1991 in Northampton. The couple live in Northamptonshire and have four children, India, Cassius, Jude and Coco.

In October 2014 she was presented with a BASCA Gold Badge award.

In February 2021 Whiley's sister Frances, who has learning difficulties and diabetes, was admitted to hospital after testing positive for coronavirus following an outbreak in her care home. Frances, who is two years younger than Whiley, has Cri du chat genetic syndrome. Whiley has publicly campaigned for those in her sister's category to receive priority in the COVID-19 vaccination programme roll-out. She repeated the plea during an interview on BBC's The Andrew Marr Show, on 21 February 2021. On 24 February it was announced that all who were on the GP learning disability register would be prioritised for a COVID-19 vaccine, meaning that 150,000 people at higher risk with severe disabilities would be offered a vaccination more quickly in England.

Charity work
Whiley is a celebrity ambassador for Mencap, a UK charity that works to support people with learning disabilities. She hosts the Little Noise Sessions concert in aid of Mencap. She is also a supporter of Tommy's – The Baby Charity. Whiley is the patron of the cri du chat syndrome support group.

On 19 March 2014, Whiley undertook a challenge for Sport Relief'', in which she walked, jogged and ran on a treadmill for 26 hours, with a five-minute rest break each hour. She did this to raise money for the Sport Relief appeal that same week. While completing the challenge she hosted two radio shows. The achievement impressed members of the band Coldplay, who donated £260,000 to Sport Relief.

References

External links
 
 Jo Whiley's Shiny Happy Playlist (BBC Radio 2)
 Jo Whiley (BBC Radio 2)
 Whiley's autobiography My World in Motion, released June 2009
 
 

1965 births
Living people
Alumni of the University of Brighton
Alumni of City, University of London
BBC Radio 1 presenters
BBC Radio 2 presenters
English journalists
English radio DJs
English television presenters
People from Northampton
People from West Northamptonshire District
Top of the Pops presenters
British women radio presenters